The 2015–16 Houston Cougars women's basketball team represented the University of Houston during the 2015–16 NCAA Division I women's basketball season. The season marked the third for the Cougars as members of the American Athletic Conference. The Cougars, led by second year head coach Ronald Hughey, played their home games at Hofheinz Pavilion. They finished the season 6–24, 2–16 in The American play to finish in last place. They lost in the first round of American Athletic women's tournament to Tulsa.

Media
All Cougars games aired on the Houston Cougars IMG Sports Network, streamed online via the Houston Portal, with Jeremy Branham and Louis Ray on the call. Before conference season home games streamed on Houston All-Access. Conference home games rotated between ESPN3, AAC Digital, and the Houston Portal. Road games typically were streamed on the opponents' websites, though some conference road games also appeared on ESPN3 or AAC Digital.

Roster

Schedule and results

|-
!colspan=12 style="background:#CC0000; color:white;"| Exhibition

|-
!colspan=12 style="background:#CC0000; color:white;"| Non-conference regular season

|-
!colspan=12 style="background:#CC0000; color:white;"| AAC regular season

|-
!colspan=12 style="background:#CC0000; color:white;"| American Athletic Conference Women's Tournament

|-

See also
2015–16 Houston Cougars men's basketball team

References

External links
Official website

Houston Cougars women's basketball seasons
Houston
Houston Cougars
Houston Cougars